Broadstone is one of the three neighbourhoods that make up present-day Phibsboro in Dublin, Ireland. The most southerly of these, it begins just two kilometres north of Father Mathew Bridge at Ormond Quay. The area is triangular, bounded by Phibsborough Road and Constitution Hill to the West, North Circular Road to the north, and Dorset Street and Bolton Street to the south-east. The postal district for the area is Dublin 7.

Overview
Broadstone was known in earlier times as Glasmanogue. The name is descriptive of a ford crossing place over the Bradogue River, a Liffey tributary stream the mouth of which is located there. The Bradogue rises in Cabra to the north-west and runs to the Liffey at Ormond Quay. It has long been culverted and now runs wholly underground. 

Broadstone Station, a former railway terminus, is located opposite the King's Inns at Constitution Hill.

Broadstone is home to a number of landmarks such as the Black Church (St. Mary's Chapel of Ease), King's Inns, Broadstone Station, the Blessington Street Basin, Berkeley Road Church (St. Joseph's), and Royal Canal Bank. Much of the area was originally part of the Grangegorman estate, the demesne, manor house and grounds of the Monck Minogue Stanley family.

The area consists of streets of small and mid-sized red-brick houses built after the development of the G.W.R. a century after the building of early Georgian Dublin in neighbouring Mountjoy, prior to the Act of Union 1801. One notable aspect of Georgian architecture retained in these modest homes was the ornate doorways with half-circle fanlights.

Broadstone does not have a village centre or main street. The Railway Terminus was the focal point of the neighbourhood and Broadstone's importance was derived came from its location as one of Dublin's then six railway termini.

History

Beginnings 
Settled by Vikings, the area was part of the Manor of Grangegorman, which was famed for its vast orchards. The green was a common, used for pasture and pleasure. Late 18th-century pictures and reports describe a boggy wetland which became a quagmire in wet weather. The original Irish name of Glas Mochanog, anglicised to 'Glasmanogue', translates as Monck (variant Minogue) Green. From the Restoration in 1660 the area was used for military parades and pageants to celebrate the Restoration of Charles II, but it was not until the late 18th century and the construction of the Royal Canal that the Broadstone, Mountjoy,  and Phibsboro became part of the city proper. Around this time the northern part of the city became fashionable with the Anglo-Irish political and commercial establishment, who made up the ruling and commercial Ascendancy of the emergent semi-autonomous Kingdom of Ireland. Notable among these was the Gardiner family, Earls of Blessington and Viscounts Mountjoy, after which the second Phibsboro neighbourhood of Mountjoy developed. Gardiner Street, Gardiner Place, Gardiner Lane, Gardiner Row, Blessington Street, Blessington Court, Blessington Lane, Blessington Basin, Mountjoy Street, Mountjoy Square, Mountjoy Place and Mountjoy Parade – all in the vicinity – are named for the Mountjoy developer family connections.

The Royal Canal 
In 1789, Dublin Corporation commissioned the Royal Canal and a harbour built on Constitution Hill, connected to the main canal at Phibsboro by a spur. In many ways the history of Broadstone is the history of this canal. Though the branch line was completed by 1796, it was ten more years before the harbour was opened; construction continued for some years afterwards. The harbour's location was chosen for its proximity to the markets and the law courts. Bolton Street was the preferred site, but high land prices and objections from local residents forced its relocation. 

By 1807 a regular passage boat service was operating to Mullingar. In subsequent years the area was a hive of industry, with many hotels and inns and the trade boats using the wharfage and stores at the harbour. The canal was linked eventually with the River Shannon in 1817 after many financial difficulties and the majority of the main route still exists. In 1810 a reservoir, the Blessington Basin, was dug from the spur to supply water to the locality.

Average annual tonnage on the canal in the 1830s was 80,000 tons and 40,000 passengers.

The King's Inns 
The King's Inns  is the oldest institution of legal education in Ireland, founded in 1542 during the reign of Henry VIII, and originally occupied property where the Four Courts now stand.  When the Four Courts were built in the 1790s, King's Inns moved to Constitution Hill. The present building, designed by James Gandon, was built opposite the harbour and, like Gandon's Four Courts and The Custom House, was designed with its frontage on a waterfront. Construction began in 1800 and completed in 1823. Famous graduates since the move to Broadstone include Edward Carson, Patrick Pearse, Charles Haughey, Mary Robinson and Michael McDowell.

The Black Church 

St. Mary's Chapel of Ease, universally known as the Black Church, was built in 1830 and was designed by John Semple. The nickname is thought to have originated due to the gloom of interior, rather than the dark-grey colour of the exterior - the building has very thick walls and narrow windows. An interesting feature of the church is that it has no distinct walls or ceilings inside, the interior consisting entirely of a parabolic arch.

Legend has it a person walking anti-clockwise with one's eyes closed, two or three times around the church at midnight, reciting the 'Hail Mary' backwards will meet the Devil, a tale probably created because of the church's having been Protestant. The striking building no longer has a religious function and is currently used as office space. 

The Black Church is mentioned briefly in the novel Ulysses by James Joyce, in the chapter entitled "Oxen of the Sun", as the location of one of Bello's many sins: He went through a form of clandestine marriage with at least one woman in the shadow of the Black Church. Joyce lived for a few months in Broadstone, at 44 Fontenoy Street, one of the Joyce family's many temporary homes around Dublin. He stayed there with his son Giorgio from July to September 1909 and again alone from October 1909 to June 1910 while trying to set up the first cinema in Dublin.

It was also used in the title of the first volume of memoirs of Austin Clarke, "Twice Round the Black Church" (1962). Clarke grew up in Broadstone, living on Middle Mountjoy Street. Both Clarke and Joyce attended nearby Belvedere College.

The church interior has been totally refurbished and is now a suite of offices.

Midland Great Western Railway and Broadstone Station 

In 1845 the Royal Canal was purchased by the Midland Great Western Railway Company for £298,059 with a view to using the land alongside the canal to construct a railway line to the west of Ireland. Broadstone railway station was completed in 1850. The building was one of Dublin's six original rail termini, the others being Westland Row (now Pearse Station) Amiens Street (now Connolly Station), Kingsbridge (now Heuston Station), North Wall and Harcourt Street (now a bar and nightclub complex).

Situated at the crest of Constitution Hill directly opposite King's Inns, the station served as the terminus of the Midland Great Western Railway. Designed by John Skipton Mulvany , Broadstone Station is constructed of granite in a neo-Egyptian style.

With Galway projected to become the main port for transatlantic passenger traffic between Europe and North America, the Midland successfully competed with its rival the Great Southern and Western Railway to reach it first. A special fourth class was introduced by the Midland for poor migrants from the west going to Britain for work. The line, which branched out to serve Sligo, Westport, Achill and Clifden, was also used to transport huge numbers of cattle.

It was about this time that the majority of the houses in the area were constructed, as dwellings for workers on the railway. Most of the worker's houses were built by the Artisan's Dwelling Company, which built many similar estates in Dublin and elsewhere, and houses of this type are now frequently described as Artisan cottages, regardless of their origin.

Decline of the canal 
The Great Irish Famine of the mid-19th century had caused a huge wave of emigration, and the population of Ireland was reduced from about 8 million in the 1830s to around 4 million a century later. The worst hit were the rural population of the west, precisely the market of the MGWR. There was a brief period of boom in the 1870s as the flow of people from the west peaked, but as the people left, traffic in the other direction reduced markedly. As emigration gradually came to a halt, so did the canal system.

The MGWR was never very interested in the canal business and in 1877 they were given permission by the government to close  of the branch line and to fill in the harbour, to construct a new forecourt for the station. That removed the need for a movable pontoon bridge, and a new approach road, Western Way, was built by way of Foster Aqueduct. The harbour was no longer needed due to the construction of one larger and better situated at Spencer Dock, and was filled in to become the forecourt of Broadstone Station.

The small reservoir had been made almost redundant by the construction of a new reservoir at Vartry in 1868, and served only the Jameson Whiskey distilleries at Smithfield, until they left the city in the 1970s.

By the 1920s average annual tonnage on the Royal Canal had reduced to 10,000 tons. In 1924 the MGWR amalgamated with its rival, the Great Southern and Western Railway, to enable rationalisation and survival, and in 1927 the bridged section under Foster aqueduct was filled in, and the canal and railway were permanently disconnected.

Decline of the railway 
By the 1930s the railway was failing too and the last train arrived from Westport in 1937. In 1944 the Canal and Railway both passed into the ownership of the state transport company Córas Iompair Éireann (CIÉ), which transferred all its steam locomotives there in 1954. However, when steam locomotion ended in 1961, Broadstone was closed. Foster Aqueduct was removed in 1951 to facilitate road widening.

Today the historic building is used as offices by Bus Éireann and the rest of the site is used a parking and servicing area for buses, with the main building mostly obscured by public housing and light industrial buildings.

Modern times 

After the closure of the railway came the hardships of the war, rationing, and a prolonged recession. Unemployment and deprivation hit the inhabitants of Dublin's north inner city hard, and the area around Dominick Street, Grangegorman and Broadstone was one of the worst affected by drug abuse, especially heroin. The park at Royal Canal Bank and the disused reservoir at Blessington Street were magnets for delinquents, as was the dereliction around Paradise Place.

The Irish Youth Hostelling association, An Óige, took over the old convent building on Mountjoy Street and this now serves as both the headquarters of the organisation and its main international hostel in Dublin.

Regeneration 

The linking canal spur was filled in and made into a long narrow park, Royal Canal Bank, in 1956. The reservoir, however, still exists.

In 1993, after decades of stagnation and neglect, Dublin Corporation's Parks Department began restoring it as a recreational facility, removing 6000 tons of silt and debris, adding a fountain, enlarging the central island for wildlife and undertaking extensive replanting.

The large site at St. Brendans Hospital, Grangegorman is currently the planned future home of the Dublin Institute of Technology, and the area development plan under the Grangegorman Development Agency proposes to use the new Grangegorman Campus to join the Grangegorman and Broadstone areas, and to provide numerous facilities and amenities for both collegiate and public use.

This is only part of a massive regeneration project for the north inner city, including the redevelopment of nearby O'Connell Street and Parnell Street as tourism and retail centres.

There have been many calls to have the main building of Broadstone Station restored, and in recent years some have suggested it as a city terminus for the proposed metro system to Dublin Airport, while others have called for the reopening of the old rail line to enable residents of outlying areas along the old route to commute to the city more easily.

Luas Green Line
The Luas Green Line,  serves the DIT Campus in Grangegorman with two Luas stops called Broadstone - DIT and Grangegorman. This connects Broadstone Plaza from Constitution Hill to Grangegorman. The Luas continues northwards to Broombridge railway station along the old Broadstone Railway line and southbound to Phibsboro and Dublin City Centre.

See also
 List of towns and villages in Ireland
 Rail transport in Ireland

References

External links
 Flickr set of photographs from Blessington Basin

Towns and villages in Dublin (city)
Railway towns in Ireland